Love to Death (Spanish: Amar a muerte) is a Mexican telenovela written by the Venezuelan author Leonardo Padrón and produced by W Studios y Lemon Studios for Televisa and Univision. The series stars Angelique Boyer and Michel Brown.

Principal photography began on 14 June 2018 and ended in December 2018. It premiered on Univision on 29 October 2018, and ended on 11 March 2019. In Mexico the series premiered on Las Estrellas on 5 November 2018, and ended on 3 March 2019.

Plot 
The series is a complex story of destinies that intersect when a media mogul, Leon Carvajal, is stabbed on his wedding day, at the same time that an assassin, Macario "El Chino"  Valdez, is executed in the electric chair. Leon is reincarnated in the body of El Chino Valdez and, in turn, El Chino's soul ends up in the body of a professor of anthropology, Beltran Camacho, who dies in a car accident. Now, each man will not only have to deal with a new body, but also adapt to a new soul.

Leon now in the body of El Chino leaves El Chino's family and immigrates to Mexico. Leon gets a new identity, Jacobo Reyes, and he begins to work as a driver in his home with the help of his best friend, Camilo. Leon/Jacobo is now trying to figure out who was responsible for his death, he also finds out his new young wife, Lucia, betrayed him with his most loyal friend, Johnny. His kids have problems of their own; his oldest daughter Eva is involved with a Drug Cartel, his son Guille does not want to work in his media company, and his youngest daughter Valentina is discovering her sexuality. He will take this second chance to fix the problems he never knew of. Starting by making Lucia fall in love with him so he could find out the truth about his death.

El Chino, now in Beltran's body, will have the opportunity to have a family. He will learn to be a good father and a good husband. He will also use this new body to his advantage to try to defeat the leaders of the drug cartel he worked for while in his original body. Beltran/Chino will also get help from a rip-off fortune teller woman who will receive powers to talk to the dead.

Trying to figure out why they are back in different bodies is not the only problem. Leon/Jacobo will have to avoid being discovered as El Chino Valdez by the police and the drug cartel. Beltran/Chino will have to find his body, Leon/Jacobo, and try to protect his real family from the cartel whom are after him.

They will begin to meet others who are just like them, reincarnated. They must find out their purpose and they will all be connected through a butterfly tattoo that extends and bleeds when they mess up.

Cast

Main 
 Michel Brown as Macario "El Chino" Valdés / León Carvajal / Jacobo Reyes
 Angelique Boyer as Lucía Borges
 Alejandro Nones as Johny Corona
 Arturo Barba as Beltrán Camacho / Macario "El Chino" Valdés
 Macarena Achaga as Valentina Carvajal
 Claudia Martín as Eva Carvajal
 Jessica Más as Lupita de Valdés
 Henry Zakka as Camilo Guerra
 Nestor Rodulfo as El Alacrán
 Gonzalo Peña as Guillermo Carvajal
 Roberto Duarte as Inspector Montilla
 Cinthia Vázquez as Alicia Camacho
 Bárbara López as Juliana Valdés
 Cayetano Arámburo as Mateo Luna
 Jessica Díaz as Renata Barranco
 Alexis Ayala as León Carvajal

Recurring 
 Alessio Valentini as Javier Beltrán
 Nastassja Villasana as La Muerte
 Raquel Garza as Barbara

Television ratings

U.S. ratings 
 
}}

Mexico ratings 
 
}}
Notes

Episodes

Special

Juliantina 
After the success of the lesbian couple of the series composed of Macarena Achaga and Bárbara López, in November 2019 Televisa confirmed that on 8 November 2019 a special edition entitled Juliantina would be released through its website, which It is composed of 19 episodes, and is remastered with the best telenovela scenes.

Episodes

Future 
On 20 December  2019, producer Billy Rovzar and Carlos Bardasano confirmed that a film based on the two characters of Bárbara López and Macarena Achaga for Videocine would be made. It was also confirmed that a series based on the two characters written by Leonardo Padrón, possibly entitled Las Juliantinas, was being written.

Awards and nominations

References

External links 
 

2018 telenovelas
2018 American television series debuts
Televisa telenovelas
Univision telenovelas
Spanish-language American telenovelas
American telenovelas
2010s American LGBT-related drama television series
2019 American television series endings
Television shows set in Mexico City
Television shows set in San Antonio